An indirect presidential election (officially the 6th Federal Convention) was held in West Germany on 23 May 1974. Though not term limited, incumbent Gustav Heinemann chose not to seek a second term. The government parties (SPD and FDP) nominated Vice-Chancellor Walter Scheel; the Christian Democratic Union nominated Richard von Weizsäcker. Scheel won the election by 32 votes on the first ballot. He served as president until 1979. Weizsäcker would later serve as president from 1984 to 1994.

Composition of the Federal Convention
The President is elected by the Federal Convention consisting of all the members of the Bundestag and an equal number of delegates representing the states. These are divided proportionally by population to each state, and each state's delegation is divided among the political parties represented in its parliament so as to reflect the partisan proportions in the parliament.

Source: Eine Dokumentation aus Anlass der Wahl des Bundespräsidenten am 18. März 2012

Results

References

1974 in West Germany
1974
May 1974 events in Europe
1974 elections in Germany
Walter Scheel
Richard von Weizsäcker